Events from the year 1907 in Canada.

Incumbents

Crown 
 Monarch – Edward VII

Federal government 
 Governor General – Albert Grey, 4th Earl Grey 
 Prime Minister – Wilfrid Laurier
 Chief Justice – Charles Fitzpatrick (Quebec) 
 Parliament – 10th

Provincial governments

Lieutenant governors 
Lieutenant Governor of Alberta – George Hedley Vicars Bulyea 
Lieutenant Governor of British Columbia – James Dunsmuir 
Lieutenant Governor of Manitoba – Daniel Hunter McMillan
Lieutenant Governor of New Brunswick – Jabez Bunting Snowball (until February 24) then Lemuel John Tweedie (from March 6)
Lieutenant Governor of Nova Scotia – Duncan Cameron Fraser   
Lieutenant Governor of Ontario – William Mortimer Clark 
Lieutenant Governor of Prince Edward Island – Donald Alexander MacKinnon 
Lieutenant Governor of Quebec – Louis-Amable Jetté 
Lieutenant Governor of Saskatchewan – Amédée Forget

Premiers 
Premier of Alberta – Alexander Cameron Rutherford    
Premier of British Columbia – Richard McBride  
Premier of Manitoba – Rodmond Roblin  
Premier of New Brunswick – Lemuel John Tweedie (until March 6) then William Pugsley (March 6 to May 31) then Clifford William Robinson 
Premier of Nova Scotia – George Henry Murray 
Premier of Ontario – James Whitney   
Premier of Prince Edward Island – Arthur Peters 
Premier of Quebec – Lomer Gouin  
Premier of Saskatchewan – Thomas Walter Scott

Territorial governments

Commissioners
 Commissioner of Yukon – John T. Lithgow (acting) (until June 17) then Alexander Henderson 
 Gold Commissioner of Yukon – F.X. Gosselin (from June 17)
 Commissioner of Northwest Territories – Frederick D. White

Events
March 6 – William Pugsley becomes premier of New Brunswick, replacing Lemuel John Tweedie
May 24 – Boer War Memorial (Montreal) unveiled 
May 30 – King Edward VII grants the Coat of Arms of Alberta
May 31 – Clifford Robinson becomes premier of New Brunswick, replacing William Pugsley
August 24 – Part of the under-construction Quebec Bridge  collapses in Quebec City killing 75 construction workers and injuring 11. 
September 7 
An anti-Asian riot in Vancouver attacks Chinatown
Alexander Grant MacKay is elected leader of the Ontario Liberal Party
September 14 – Jasper Forest Park later named Jasper National Park is established.

Full date unknown
The National Council for Women demands "equal pay for equal work"
The world's first rotary telephone came into use at Sydney Mines, Nova Scotia
The first Sobeys opens in Stellarton, Nova Scotia

Births

January to June
January 14 – Georges-Émile Lapalme, politician (d.1985)
January 26 – Hans Selye, endocrinologist (d.1982)
February 9 – Harold Scott MacDonald Coxeter, geometer (d.2003)
March 20 – Hugh MacLennan, author and professor of English (d.1990)

March 24 – Paul Sauvé, lawyer, soldier, politician and 17th Premier of Quebec (d.1960)
April 16 – Joseph-Armand Bombardier, inventor, businessman and founder of Bombardier Inc. (d.1964)
April 17 – Louis-Philippe-Antoine Bélanger, politician (d.1989)

July to December
July 6 – George Stanley, historian, author, soldier, teacher, public servant and designer of the current Canadian flag (d.2002)
August 5 – Herman Linder, rodeoist
August 24 – Alfred Belzile, politician and farmer
September 3 – Andrew Brewin, lawyer and politician (d.1983)

September 15 – Fay Wray, actress (d.2004)
October 20 – Carl Goldenberg, lawyer, arbitrator, mediator and Senator (d.1996)
November 19 – Frederick Thomas Armstrong, politician (d.1990)
November 21 – Christie Harris, children's author (d.2002)
December 12 – Fleurette Beauchamp-Huppé, pianist, soprano and teacher (d.2007)

Unknown
 Edythe Shuttleworth, mezzo-soprano (d.1983)

Deaths

January to June
January 1 – William Pearce Howland, politician (b.1811) 
January 25 – Andrew George Blair, politician and 6th Premier of New Brunswick (b.1844)
January 31 – Timothy Eaton, businessman and founder of Eaton's (b.1834)
March 3 – Oronhyatekha, Mohawk physician and scholar (b.1841)
March 8 – Edward Cochrane, politician (b.1834)
March 20 – Louis Adolphe Billy, politician and lawyer (b.1834) 
April 6 – William Henry Drummond, poet (b.1854)
June 12 – John Waldie, politician (b.1833)

July to December
August 10 – James Brien, politician and physician (b.1848)
September 26 – Alexander Gunn, politician (b.1828)
October 10 – Cassie Chadwick, fraudster (b.1857)
October 13 – Harvey William Burk, politician and farmer (b.1822)

Historical documents
Report that staff "minimize the dangers of infection" in "the defective sanitary condition" of many residential schools in Prairie Provinces

Newspaper covers "not too favorable a report" issued by Dr. Peter Bryce, concluding "vigorous action cannot be long delayed"

Missing residential school boys are forced to run back with arms tied, and church committee advises against that to avoid cruelty complaints

Fallout from September 7 riot against Asian Canadians in Vancouver

Opposition Leader Robert Borden's Vancouver speech on restricting East Asian immigration

Mackenzie King believes workers running cooperative will learn capitalists' risks and responsibilities, thus reducing labour strife

Rudyard Kipling speaks on spirit of development in Winnipeg

Photo and text: Winnipeg Beach, Lake Winnipeg, Manitoba

Speech on U.S. influence on Canadian thought, habits, literature and press

Local Saskatchewan debate on women's suffrage results in negative decision

Western boards of trade resolutions call for state-supported hospitals

Mayor of Prince Albert, Saskatchewan advocates transportation route to Hudson Bay

Stinkers, mortal terror, and common enemy: automobile issues in Nova Scotia

McGill University principal on place of classical studies in modern education

Article on inner workings of Marconi wireless telegraph station

Minister and three other rowers survive ice and huge waves in Notre Dame Bay, Newfoundland

References

 
Years of the 20th century in Canada
Canada
Canada